GNOME Videos, formerly known as Totem, is a media player (audio and video) for the GNOME computer desktop environment. GNOME Videos uses the Clutter and GTK+ toolkits. It is officially included in GNOME starting from version 2.10 (released in March 2005), but de facto it was already included in most GNOME environments. Totem utilizes the GStreamer framework for playback, though until version 2.27.1, it could alternatively be configured to use the Xine libraries instead of GStreamer.

GNOME Videos is free and open-source software subject to the requirements of the GPL-2.0-or-later license.

Features
Until recently there were two distinct versions of Totem, though the difference was not visible at the user interface level. One of them was based on GStreamer, which is a plugin-based multimedia framework. This version has superior extensibility and supports a larger variety of media formats. The other one was based on xine, which is a regular multimedia library. At the time the latter had better encrypted DVD playback support, DVD navigation support and could play some files the GStreamer version couldn't handle. Due to enhancements in GStreamer including the ability to play back encrypted DVDs, the Totem development team dropped support for the xine backend.

Totem is closely integrated with the GNOME desktop environment and its file manager, GNOME Files. This includes generating thumbnails of video files when browsing in GNOME Files and a video plugin for Netscape-compatible browsers (e.g. Firefox and GNOME Web).

Thanks to a large number of plugins developed for GStreamer, Totem is able to play all mainstream media formats, both open and proprietary ones. It also understands numerous playlist formats, including SHOUTcast, M3U, XML Shareable Playlist Format (XSPF), SMIL, Windows Media Player playlists and RealAudio playlists. Playlists are easily manageable using drag-and-drop features.

Full-screen video playback is supported on nearly all X configurations, including multi-head Xinerama setups, and on displays connected to the TV-Out. Brightness, contrast and saturation of the video can be dynamically adjusted during playback. 4.0, 4.1, 5.0, 5.1 and stereophonic sound is supported. On computers with an infrared port, Totem can be remotely controlled via LIRC. Stills can be easily captured without resorting to external programs. There is also a plugin for telestrator-like functionality using Gromit. The loading of external SubRip subtitles, both automatic and manual (via the command-line), is also supported.

The player was known as Totem. With the release of version 3.5.90, the name was changed to Videos. The name 'Totem', remained in 'de facto' use (the executable, for example, still uses the Totem name, as does its package in Debian).

GNOME 3.12 revamped the user interface radically and added support for direct playback from online video channels such as Guardian and Apple trailers.

Video acceleration 
Whether GNOME Videos can offload computations for video decoding to SIP blocks such as PureVideo, UVD, QuickSync Video, TI Ducati through interfaces, like e.g. VDPAU, VAAPI, Distributed Codec Engine or DXVA depends entirely on the back-end. See GStreamer or Xine for such support.

See also

 Parole Media Player - another media player based on GStreamer, it is light-weight and has similar user interface like the old GNOME Videos.

References

External links

 

2003 software
Free audio software
Free media players
Free software programmed in C
Free software programmed in Vala
GNOME Core Applications
Linux media players
Software that uses Clutter (software)
Software that uses GStreamer
Software that uses Meson
Video player software that uses GTK